Charles McDonnell may refer to:

 Charles McDonnell (police officer) (1841–1888), American police captain in the New York City Police Department
 Charles Edward McDonnell (1854–1921), American prelate of the Roman Catholic Church
 Charles James McDonnell (born 1928), American Roman Catholic titular bishop
 Charles J. McDonnell (born 1928), U.S. Army officer